Salma Ataullahjan (born April 29, 1952) is a Canadian Senator named on the advice of Prime Minister Stephen Harper, on July 9, 2010, and sits with the Conservative caucus. She had been the Conservative Party's unsuccessful candidate in Mississauga—Brampton South during the 2008 federal election losing to  Liberal MP Navdeep Bains.

Ataullahjan is an advocate for the Pakistani community; she has served on the executive board of the Canadian branch of The Citizens Foundation, an international organization that since 1995 has built 730 schools for Pakistan’s poorest children and is an executive member of the Canadian Pashtun Cultural Association. She immigrated to Canada in 1980 from Pakistan as a new bride. Prior to her appointment to the Senate she worked in the Toronto area as a realtor. She has a diploma in computer operations and is also an artist. She stated her political heroes were Khan Abdul Ghaffar Khan, Emily Stowe and Terry Fox.

She founded the parents council at David Lewis Public School in Toronto and has also served on the executive of the Pakistani Canadian Professionals and Academics and as president and vice-president of the Canadian Pashtun Cultural Association. She is also on the executive of the South Asian Regional Council and Citizens Foundation's Toronto chapter.

Family

Ataullahjan was born in Mardan, Khyber Pakhtunkhwa, Pakistan into a Pashtun family. Her great-great-uncle Bacha Khan, led a non-violent Khudai Khidmatgar Muslim movement for Indian independence from the British rule. Her father is Saranjam Khan, a former Pakistani senator and until recently secretary-general of Nawaz Sharif's Pakistan Muslim League (N) party. As a schoolgirl, she was friends with Benazir Bhutto.

See also
Pakistani Canadian

References

External links
 
Official Website
Salma Ataullahjan's Artwork

1952 births
Canadian senators from Ontario
Conservative Party of Canada senators
Living people
Canadian Muslims
Pakistani emigrants to Canada
Naturalized citizens of Canada
Conservative Party of Canada candidates for the Canadian House of Commons
Women members of the Senate of Canada
Canadian people of Pakistani descent
Canadian people of Pashtun descent
People from Mardan District
Canadian politicians of Pakistani descent
21st-century Canadian women politicians